Memorial Gates are a military memorial which are part of the University of Saskatchewan, City of Saskatoon, Saskatchewan. These Gates were originally the entrance gates to the university campus and flanked University Drive. In the 1980s, due to increased traffic to the southwest portion of the campus, primarily Royal University Hospital, a new road entrance was built to the west. The gates remain, with the remnant of University Drive passing through them renamed Memorial Crescent. The gates are now primarily used by pedestrians, though the roadway is open to vehicles.

Memorial Gates
University of Saskatchewan

Listing of those alumni who gave their lives in the Great War
These are they who went forth from this University to the Great War 1914–1918 and gave their lives that we might live in freedom

 Ypres
 Somme
 Vimy
 Paschendale

Erection Date
Memorial Gates erected 1927 a.d.

Ashes
The ashes of Frederick W. A. G. Haultain were scattered at the gates.

Nearby
 College Building (Saskatchewan)
 Rugby Chapel
 Victoria One Room School house
 St. Andrew's College
 Royal University Hospital

References
This article uses the primary source images as documentation for this article.  The memorial gates etch the University of Saskatchewan alumni who have fallen in the great war into the stone work.  Click on an image for more detail.

Footnotes

External links
 The Encyclopedia of Saskatchewan |196th (Western Universities) Battalion
 On Campus News – Memorial Gates commemorate 67 students and ...
 Memorial Gates

University of Saskatchewan
Canadian military memorials and cemeteries
Buildings and structures in Saskatoon
World War I memorials in Canada
Gates in Canada
Monuments and memorials in Saskatchewan